Archaeological Institute may refer to
 Royal Archaeological Institute, founded 1844
 UCL Institute of Archaeology, founded 1937, academic department at University College London (UCL), England.